A Bewildered Lovebird is a 2010 Egyptian film.

Plot 
Bolbol wakes up in a full-body cast after a mysterious accident shattered every last bone in his body. He's lying in a hospital bed, where he'll probably spend the next few weeks, and with him is Dr. Amal, a dedicated physician taking care of his needs. Bolbol warms up to the perky doctor and shares with her his story with her in painstaking detail.

As the owner of a small ad agency, he first meets Yasmin, a harmonica playing member of a rock band. At first Bolbol is smitten by her carefree attitude and lack of jealousy until the novelty wears off. Just as his fondness turns into frustration towards Yasmin, in walks Hala, a helpless girl who is in many ways the polar opposite of Yasmin.

Bolbol spends more and more time with Hala, ultimately falling for her, but at the same time he can't shake off his love for Yasmin. Both women seem to have something that Bolbol desires, and our poor hero is torn between the two. And therein lies his predicament: should Bolbol go for the independent, self-empowered though occasionally cold Yasmin? Or is the submissive and helpless Hala a better fit for his traditionalist values, even though she can be very overbearing?

Cast 
 Ahmed Helmy as Bolbol 
 Zeina as Yasmin
 Shery Adel as Hala
 Emy Samir Ghanem as Dr. Amal

See also 
Cinema of Egypt

External links 
 

2010 films
2010s Arabic-language films
Films set in Egypt
2010 romantic comedy-drama films
Egyptian romantic comedy-drama films
2010 comedy films
2010 drama films